"Bills" is the debut single by American rapper LunchMoney Lewis. The song was released on February 5, 2015, by Kemosabe Records. The song topped the charts in Australia and peaked within the top ten of the charts in Belgium (Flanders), New Zealand, Ireland, and the United Kingdom. The extended play was released in April.

Background and composition
Lewis discussed the song's conception: "Ricky played the beat and that just started the idea. I sang 'I got bills' and he just popped up off his chair. It was like a chain reaction. Ricky doesn't really get excited about much. I don't either because we write so much, so it's hard to gauge but there was a good feeling. We were writing about things people can relate to, which is fun. It's all truthful."

Described as a novelty song, "Bills" features "elements of hip-hop and soul, with a ragtag, jazz sound". The song has a tempo of 126 beats per minute, and is in the key of F major.

Music video
A music video to accompany the release of "Bills" was first released onto YouTube on February 20, 2015. The video is directed by Emil Nava.

Track listing

EP

Credits and personnel
Credits from ASCAP.
 Eric Frederic – composer
 Rickard Göransson – composer 
 Jacob Kasher – composer
 Gamal Lewis – composer
 Ricky Reed – producer, programmer, recording engineer
 Drew Kapner – recording engineer
 Kyle Mann – recording engineer
 Alex Gruszecki – assistant engineer
 John Hanes – mixing engineer
 Serban Ghenea – mixing engineer
 Chris Gehringer – mastering engineer

Charts and certifications

Weekly charts

Year-end charts

Certifications

Release history

References

2014 songs
2015 debut singles
LunchMoney Lewis songs
Songs written by Jacob Kasher
Songs written by Ricky Reed
Number-one singles in Australia
Number-one singles in Scotland
Songs written by Rickard Göransson
Songs written by LunchMoney Lewis
Kemosabe Records singles
Columbia Records singles